Organizations calling themselves the Musicians' Union include:

Danish Musicians' Union
Musicians' Union of Maldives
Musicians' Union (UK)
Musicians Union of South Africa
Swedish Musicians' Union
Several locals of the American Federation of Musicians, e.g. Musicians' Union Local No. 6 San Francisco